{{Infobox military person
| name          = Alfred Raoul
| image         = Alfred R. Aoul2.png
| caption       = Alfred Raoul while Prime Minister of the Republic of the Congo, November 1969
| birth_name    = 
| nickname      = 
| birth_date    = 
| birth_place   = Pointe-Noire, French Equatorial Africa
| death_date    = 
| death_place   = Paris, France
| placeofburial = Pointe-Noire
| spouse = Emilienne Raoul
| allegiance    = 
| branch        = 
| serviceyears  = 
| rank          = 
| unit          = 
| commands      = 
| battles       = 
| awards        = 
| children     = 2
| laterwork     = {{plainlist|
 Politician
 President of the Republic of the Congo
 Vice President of the Republic of the Congo
Prime Minister of the Republic of the Congo
}}
| signature     = 
}}Alfred Raoul''' (15 December 1938 – 16 July 1999) was President of the Republic of the Congo from 5 September 1968 to 1 January 1969, and the Prime Minister of the Republic of the Congo from August 1968 to December 1969.

He was Vice President of the People's Republic of Congo from January 1970 to December 1971. 

He was married to Émilienne Raoul.

Military career 
He did his secondary studies at the Victor-Augagneur igh school in Pointe-Noire, and left the Congo in 1959 to join the army.

References

1938 births
1999 deaths
Prime Ministers of the Republic of the Congo
Vice presidents of the Republic of the Congo
École Spéciale Militaire de Saint-Cyr alumni